The Coastal Conservation League is a nature conservation organization focused on protecting and enhancing the environment of South Carolina.  Its executive director is Laura Cantral, who replaced founder Dana Beach in 2018.

References

Environmental organizations based in South Carolina
Environmental organizations established in 1989
1989 establishments in the United States